Gladstone is the surname of:

 Catherine Gladstone (1812–1900), wife of William Ewart Gladstone
 Henry Gladstone, 1st Baron Gladstone of Hawarden (1852–1935), son of William Ewart Gladstone
 Herbert Gladstone, 1st Viscount Gladstone (1854–1930), cabinet minister and governor-general of South Africa; youngest son of William Ewart Gladstone
 James Gladstone (1887–1971), Canadian senator
 John Gladstone (disambiguation)
 Lily Gladstone, American actress
 Steve Gladstone, American rowing coach
 Sir Thomas Gladstone, 2nd Baronet (1804–1889), British MP, elder brother of William Ewart Gladstone
 Wayne Gladstone, American humorist and author
 William Gladstone (disambiguation)

See also
 Mary Gladstane (born 1830), Irish-American actress in Australia

English-language surnames